Velindomimus fasciatus is a species of beetle in the family Carabidae, the only species in the genus Velindomimus.

References

Lebiinae